George Toone (10 June 1868 – 1 September 1943) was an English international footballer, who played as a goalkeeper. His son, also called George also played professional football.

Career
Born in Nottingham, Toone played professionally for Notts County, Bedminster and Bristol City. He earned two international caps for England in 1892.

References

External links

1868 births
1943 deaths
English footballers
England international footballers
Notts County F.C. players
Bedminster F.C. players
Bristol City F.C. players
English Football League players
Association football goalkeepers
Southern Football League players
FA Cup Final players